Jens Odewald (September 21, 1940 in Hanover) is a German business executive. He was Chairman of the Board of Management of Kaufhof AG, a position he held for ten years until his dismissal in 1995. In 1996, he founded the investment company Odewald & Cie.

References 

Living people
Businesspeople from Hanover
1940 births